Medlingen is a municipality in the district of Dillingen in Bavaria in Germany. The town is a member of the municipal association Gundelfingen an der Donau.

References

Dillingen (district)